William-Henry Gauvin  (March 30, 1913 – June 6, 1994) was Canadian chemical engineer. He was also an educator and championed industry-university-governmental research in Canada.

Early life
William H. Gauvin was born in Paris, France, on 1913. 
He attended schools in Europe before moving to Montreal, Canada. He received his B.Eng. (1941), M. Eng. (1942) and Ph.D. (1945) degree from McGill University.

Career
He was a professor of Chemical Engineering at McGill University. He worked as a consultant at Pulp and Paper Research Institute of Canada, Montréal from 1951 to 1957. He was a director on advanced technology at Noranda Research Center from 1982 to 1983. He was also a Scientific Advisor to Director at Institut de recherche d'Hydro-Québec  from 1983 to 1990.

Honours

 Fellow of the Royal Society of Canada
 Fellow of the American Institute of Chemical Engineers
 Honorary Fellow, Institution of Chemical Engineers, United Kingdom
 Honorary Fellow, Chemical Institute of Canada
 In 1975 he was made a Companion of the Order of Canada.
 In 1984 he was awarded the Government of Quebec's Prix Marie-Victorin.
 In 1986 he was awarded the Royal Society of Canada's Thomas W. Eadie Medal.

Honorary Doctorate Degrees:

1968  D. Eng., honoris causa, Waterloo University
1984 	D. Sc., honoris causa, McGill University
1984 	D. Sc., honoris causa, Queen's University
1986 	D. Sc., honoris causa, McMaster University

References

1913 births
1994 deaths
Canadian engineering researchers
Canadian chemical engineers
Companions of the Order of Canada
Fellows of the Royal Society of Canada
French emigrants to Quebec
McGill University Faculty of Engineering alumni
Fellows of the American Institute of Chemical Engineers